Thomas Martin Brennan (born October 30, 1952) is a former pitcher in Major League Baseball. He pitched from 1981 to 1985 for the Cleveland Indians, Chicago White Sox and Los Angeles Dodgers. He was called “The Grey Flamingo” for his odd pitching delivery of pausing briefly on one leg before continuing with his pitch. Vin Scully delighted in highlighting the nickname and pitching style during a nationally broadcast baseball game on Saturday, April 7, 1984, in which Jack Morris pitched a no-hitter.

Brennan played college baseball for Lewis University in Romeoville, Illinois, where he helped the Flyers win the 1974 NAIA World Series. He was additionally named the MVP of the tournament.

Brennan was inducted in the College Hall of Fame in 2021

External links

1952 births
Living people
Los Angeles Dodgers players
Cleveland Indians players
Chicago White Sox players
Wausau Timbers players
Major League Baseball pitchers
Lewis Flyers baseball players
Oklahoma City 89ers players
San Jose Bees players
Williamsport Tomahawks players
Waterloo Indians players
Jersey City Indians players
Toledo Mud Hens players
Portland Beavers players
Tacoma Tugs players
Tacoma Tigers players
Charleston Charlies players
Denver Zephyrs players
Albuquerque Dukes players
Baseball players from Chicago